Chutinza is a  high inactive volcano in the Andes, part of the Millunu volcanic complex. In the first stage of its activity, andesite and dacite lava flows with minor pyroclastic components generated a stratovolcano with a crater named Cerro Chutinza Viejo on its northeastern side.

References 

Volcanoes of Chile
Volcanoes of Bolivia